The Old Homestead is a 1922 American silent drama film directed by James Cruze and written by Julien Josephson, Perley Poore Sheehan, and Frank E. Woods based upon the play of the same name by Denman Thompson. The film stars Theodore Roberts, George Fawcett, T. Roy Barnes, Fritzi Ridgeway, Harrison Ford, James Mason, and Kathleen O'Connor. The film was released on October 8, 1922, by Paramount Pictures.

Plot
As described in a film magazine review, the village vamp induces the town weakling, who works in the general store, to steal for her. Suspicion of the crimes fall upon Reuben Whitcomb, the son of Uncle Joshua, and he flees from town. The storekeeper, who holds a mortgage on Uncle Joshua's house, has decided to put it under the auction hammer because the mortgage cannot be paid off. Through a round of dramatic events the facts are revealed as they actually are, and everything turns out happy to all involved.

Cast

Preservation
A print of The Old Homestead is in the Gosfilmofond film archive.

References

External links 

 
 

1922 films
1920s English-language films
Silent American drama films
1922 drama films
Paramount Pictures films
Films directed by James Cruze
American black-and-white films
American silent feature films
1920s American films